The Billy-Club Puppets (Los títeres de cachiporra) is a play for puppet theatre by the twentieth-century Spanish playwright Federico García Lorca. It was written between 1922 and 1925. It is about a beautiful heroine named Rosita who falls in love with a poor boy named Cocoliche, but has to marry Don Cristóbal, a rich old, lazy lump with a big billy club. Meanwhile, there are bar fights, some mean smugglers, and Fígaro and Wearisome discover a deep, dark secret about Don Cristóbal. He gave it the subtitle "Tragi-comedy of Don Cristóbal and Miss Rosita: A Guignolesque farce in six scenes and an announcement." Don Cristóbal is a kind of Punch character (which itself was based on Pulcinella), who also appears in García Lorca's other, later puppet play, The Puppet Play of Don Cristóbal (written in 1931).

Works cited
 García Lorca, Federico. 1970. The Billy-Club Puppets. In Five Plays: Comedies and Tragi-Comedies. Trans. James Graham-Lujan and Richard L. O'Connell. London: Penguin. . p. 21-60.
 García Lorca, Francisco. 1963. Introduction. In Five Plays: Comedies and Tragi-Comedies by Federico García Lorca. Trans. James Graham-Lujan and Richard L. O'Connell. London: Penguin, 1970. . p. 9-20.

References

Plays by Federico García Lorca
1925 plays
Plays featuring puppetry